The Marici were a Celto-Ligurian tribe dwelling around present-day Pavia (Lombardy) during the Iron Age.

Name
The ethnic name Marici can be translated as 'the big ones', from the Celtic stem maro- ('tall'). According to Patrizia de Bernardo Stempel, such linguistically Celtic tribal names suggest that a Celto-Ligurian dialect played an important role among the languages spoken in ancient Ligury.

Geography 
The Marici lived around the modern town of Pavia. Their territory was located south of the Laevi, west of the Ladatini, north of the Anamares.

History 
In the Third Book of his Natural History, Pliny the Elder identifies them as the co-founders, along with the Laevi, of Ticinum, the modern Pavia.

References

Bibliography

Ligures
Pavia